Viva Maria! is a 1965 adventure comedy film starring Brigitte Bardot and Jeanne Moreau as two women named Maria who meet and become revolutionaries in the early 20th century. It also starred George Hamilton as Florès, a revolutionary leader. It was co-written and directed by Louis Malle, and filmed in Eastman Color. The costumes were by Pierre Cardin.

It was released in both French and an English-dubbed version.

Plot synopsis
In 1907, in a Central American country called San Miguel, Maria II (Brigitte Bardot), the daughter of an Irish Republican anarchist, meets Maria I (Jeanne Moreau), the singer of a circus. After her father dies, Maria II hides in the circus where she sees Maria I's partner commit suicide after a failed love affair. Both Marias agree to form a theatrical team.

In her debut as a singer, Maria II accidentally invents striptease, an action that lets the circus achieve great fame. Shortly afterwards the Marias meet Florès (George Hamilton), a socialist revolutionary. He invites them to join his cause, a revolution against "El Dictador" (José Ángel Espinoza). But Florès is soon shot. On his deathbed he makes Maria I promise to carry through with his cause and she agrees. Though at first reluctant to acquiesce to Florès' and Maria I's endeavor, Maria II joins the cause when she comes to the aid of her vulnerable friend.

The rest of the film concerns the revolution. After Maria I leads her men into an ambush, and Maria II saves them, the women create a peasant army, organizing the countryside into a quasi-Socialist state. There are numerous sight gags and comic actions.

Preparing to take the capital city, the Marias are captured by Catholic churchmen who fear the disorder of a revolution and want to stop the people from treating the women like saints. After a bungled attempt to tickle torture them (the Inquisition's equipment is too old to work well) the Marias are rescued by their victorious army. Finally they move to France, where the circus is recreated as a successful musical version of the revolution. The women now wear dark wigs to look more "Latin American".

Cast

 Jeanne Moreau as Maria I
 Brigitte Bardot as Marie Fitzgerald O'Malley (Maria II)
 George Hamilton as Flores
 Paulette Dubost as Mme Diogène
 Claudio Brook as The Great Rodolfo
 Carlos López Moctezuma as Rodríguez (as Carlos Lopez Moctezuma)
 Poldo Bendandi as Werther
 Gregor von Rezzori as Diogène (as Gregor Von Rezzori)
 Francisco Reiguera as Father Superior
 Jonathan Eden as Juanito Diogène
 Roberto Pedret as Pablo
 José Ángel Espinosa 'Ferrusquilla' as The Dictator of San Miguel (as José Ángel Espinoza)

Production

Development
According to Jeff Stafford of Turner Classic Movies, "Malle's idea [was] to take a buddy movie and subvert it. For inspiration, he instructed Carrière to consider the Gary Cooper – Burt Lancaster relationship in Vera Cruz (1954), which was a favorite Western of the two collaborators. By replacing the traditional male protagonists with two strong females, Viva Maria! not only worked as an amusing gender twist on a popular formula, but was seen in some quarters as a political statement.

Malle said German filmmaker Rainer Werner Fassbinder later told him that Viva Maria! fascinated him and his fellow students at Berlin University. Malle recalled, 'It was a time of those radical student movements, and they saw in the heroines the two different approaches to revolution.'"

Malle conceived of the film as "a sort of burlesque boxing match—sexpot v. seductress"; he got the film financed on the condition that Moreau commit to the project.

The male lead was George Hamilton, whom Malle cast on the strength of his performance in Two Weeks in Another Town. Malle said "he was a personal choice and I am happy with him... He's more interested in being in the social columns – I don't understand – when he should be one of the greatest of his generation."

Shooting
Moreau and Bardot became "like two pals in the army" after 16 weeks of principal photography in Mexico, including Texcoco.

Filming started 18 January 1965.

An extra was killed during filming when he fell off an ox cart. Filming was also held up when Bardot fell ill.

The dialogue is in English, French, Spanish, and German, depending on the actor. The French version includes extensive English subtitles.

Reception

Critical
Time called it a "jaunty but slipshod farce"; "Having saddled himself with an idea that often seems too silly for words, Director Malle rides to the rescue with more anti-state, anti-church, antedated spoofery than he can gracefully handle. His rhythm is erratic, as though he were trying to make a movie in five or six different styles at the same time, none wholly his own. But even the deadly slow stretches are redeemed by cameraman Henri Decaë, whose breathtakingly sophisticated photography is a show in itself, imperceptibly shaded as the action moves from lush Rousseau tropics to the cabaret scenes that exude a smoky golden haze in which Moreau and Bardot appear like creatures of Lautrec or Degas, ineffably alluring." According to Variety, the film has "B.B. in her best form since And God Created Woman, and brilliantly matched by Jeanne Moreau. They are backed by a rollicking, comic adventure opus impeccably brought off by director Louis Malle."

Box office
The film was a box office hit in France with 3,450,559 attendees. It was the ninth most popular film of 1965 in France, after The Sucker, Goldfinger, Thunderball, Gendarme in New York, Mary Poppins, Fantomas Unleashed, God's Thunder and The Wise Guys.

It grossed $875,000 in rentals in the U.S. and $5,150,000 in rentals worldwide.

In Dallas, Texas, the film was banned for its sexual and anti-Catholic content; the ban was lifted by default in 1968, when the United States Supreme Court struck down the ban and limited the ability of municipalities to ban films for adults in Interstate Circuit, Inc. v. City of Dallas.

In 2010, Viva Maria! was exhibited at the 21st Ankara International Film Festival as part of a "Power and Rebellion" programme.

Awards
Both Moreau and Bardot were nominated for Best Foreign Actress at the 20th British Academy Film Awards; Jeanne Moreau won the award.

Home video
MGM/UA released Viva Maria! on VHS in February 1994.

The last minute of the movie, depicting the women singing a song in Spanish on stage, was cut after the film's New York premiere. MGM Technical Services archivist John Kirk was able to restore this final scene to the laserdisc release in 1998. The version shown on MGM's This TV cable channel includes the scene.

Adaptations

The film was adapted into a newspaper comic in 1965, drawn by Julio Ribera.

See also
Bandidas, a 2006 comedy sometimes compared to Viva Maria!

References

External links
 
 
 
 
March 1965 cover story on Jeanne Moreau, prepared during the filming of Viva Maria!

1965 films
1960s adventure comedy films
1965 Western (genre) films
1960s Western (genre) comedy films
French adventure comedy films
French Western (genre) comedy films
Films directed by Louis Malle
Films with screenplays by Jean-Claude Carrière
Films scored by Georges Delerue
Films shot in Mexico
Films about revolutions
Films set in 1907
Films set in South America
Films set in Central America
Films adapted into comics
Girls with guns films
United Artists films
Circus films
English-language French films
1960s female buddy films
French female buddy films
1965 comedy films
1960s French films